Klepač, Klepáč (Czech/Slovak feminine: Klepáčová), or Klepac is a surname of Slovene, Croatian, Czech, and Slovak origin. Notable people with the surname include:

 Andreja Klepač (born 1986), Slovenian tennis player
 Mihael Klepač (born 1997), Croatian footballer
 Peter Klepáč (born 1975), Slovak ice hockey player
 Eva Klepáčová (1933–2012), Czech actress

See also
 

Slovak-language surnames
Slovene-language surnames
Czech-language surnames
Croatian surnames